The straw-headed bulbul (Pycnonotus zeylanicus) is a species of songbird in the bulbul family, Pycnonotidae. It is found from the Malay Peninsula to Borneo. Its natural habitats are subtropical or tropical moist lowland forest, subtropical or tropical mangrove forest, subtropical or tropical moist shrubland, arable land, plantations, and rural gardens. It is threatened by habitat loss and poaching.

The straw-headed bulbul is prized for its singing ability and is a highly sought-after species by bird enthusiasts in Southeast Asia, especially Indonesia. This trade is causing population reductions across the species' range and is a major barrier to its conservation. Trapping has been facilitated in recent years by the spread of logging roads across its forest habitat. Due to this, the straw-headed bulbul was uplisted from endangered to critically endangered on the IUCN Red List in 2018.

Taxonomy and systematics
The straw-headed bulbul was originally described in the genus Sturnus. Alternate names for the straw-headed bulbul include the star-crowned bulbul, straw-crowned bulbul and yellow-crowned bulbul.

References

External links 
 

Pycnonotus
Birds of Brunei
Birds of Malesia
Birds described in 1789
Taxa named by Johann Friedrich Gmelin
Taxonomy articles created by Polbot